Bailey of Bristol
is one of the UK's biggest manufacturers of leisure vehicles – touring caravans and motorhomes. In 2017 it achieved a record turnover of £144 million. It has about 450 employees, and an annual production of around 6,500 vehicles (caravans and motorhomes combined).

All Bailey leisure vehicles are built using the company's patented Alu-Tech construction system.

The company was officially founded in 1948. It has always been based in Bristol and claims to be the longest established caravan manufacturer. In 2018 it celebrated its 70th anniversary.

In 2012, its 65th year, The Queen accompanied by The Duke of Edinburgh, visited Bailey of Bristol and toured its factory. as part of the Diamond Jubilee tour of the UK.

The company’s main manufacturing plant is based at South Liberty Lane in South Bristol and it also has a Large Panel Laminating Plant in Clevedon, North Somerset which produces the caravan and motorhome body shell panels. In addition it has a subsidiary business, PRIMA Leisure, located in North Bristol, which supplies parts for Bailey caravans and motorhomes as well as general outdoor leisure accessories.

Famous Bailey caravan owners include Dame Margaret Beckett DBE MP.  and the TV presenter Rowland Rivron

History

1948 - Company Beginnings 
Bailey of Bristol was founded by Martin Bailey, who built the first Bailey caravan in his South Bristol garage in 1947, going on to sell it at Ashton Gate market for £200.

A year later in 1948, F.G Bailey Ltd was formed and went into production. After the Second World War, caravan popularity grew massively with holidaymakers, and was also used as a form of temporary accommodation both during and after wartime. Bailey responded by creating a range of models, from the small tourers like the Minor and the Maritza to the Maison – an 18ft caravan designed to provide accommodation during the housing shortage.

1950 to 2000 - A new site and advances in production 
The company developed rapidly throughout the 1950s and soon outgrew its original site on Bedminster Road. At the end of the decade, Bailey moved to South Liberty Lane where it still operates from today.

In 1977, Patrick and Stephen Howard purchased the company and Bailey has remained in Howard family ownership up to the present day.

By the early 1980’s, Bailey had purchased the sections of industrial land either side of the original South Liberty Lane site. This combined with advances in manufacturing techniques and design technology, meant they were able to significantly increase caravan production volumes during this period.

During the 1980’s the company began producing the Pageant and Senator ranges which remained in its caravan model line up for over 25 years.

2000 to 2016 - The Great Recession to further company expansion 
During the recession of the mid 2000’s, Bailey tackled the financial climate by continuing to acquire more land for its production facility and focusing on product diversification.

In 2009 Bailey introduced the Pegasus caravan range which was the first of its products to feature the new Alu-Tech body shell construction. All ranges introduced after this have been built using the same technology.

Two years later in 2011, the first Bailey motorhome was launched – the Approach SE. Using the same award-winning design principals as Bailey caravans, this range established Bailey within the motorhome market.

In 2012 as part of her Diamond Jubilee Tour, Her Majesty the Queen accompanied by the Duke of Edinburgh visited Bailey of Bristol and toured the factory. This year was also Bailey of Bristol’s 65th anniversary.

In 2016, Bailey Parts & Accessories registered as a separate company and moved from the South Liberty Lane site to its own premises just off of the M4/M5 Interchange in North Bristol. In 2019, Bailey Parts & Accessories changed its name to PRIMA Leisure offering parts & accessories to all caravans & motorhome owners through an on-line web site. .

In the same year, Bailey opened its new Replenishment Centre on the South Liberty Lane site. This building houses all the parts and materials needed on site to manufacture Bailey caravans and motorhomes. The Mayor of Bristol, Marvin Rees, opened the Replenishment Centre in October 2016.

The final change to the business during this period also came in 2016 with the opening of Bailey’s Large Panel Laminating Plant at Clevedon. Here the caravan and motorhome floors, ceiling and side panels are produced and delivered to the main site in Bristol, 12 miles away, on a daily basis. Moving this part of the operation to a separate location freed up more space at South Liberty Lane to increase manufacturing capacity there.

Current Model Range 

Caravans
 Discovery
 Phoenix+
 Unicorn Series V
 Pegasus Grande SE
 Alicanto Grande Series II

Motorhomes
 Adamo
 Autograph Series III

Discontinued models 

Caravans

 Alicanto Grande Series I (2019 - 2022)
 Unicorn Black Edition (2019 - 2021)
 Pegasus Grande SE (2018 - 2020)
 Discovery (2001–2010)
 Phoenix Series I (2018 - 2020)
 Pegasus GT70 (2017 - 2018)
 Unicorn Series IV (2017 - 2019)
 Pursuit Series II (2017 - 2018)
 Pegasus Series IV (2015 - 2017)
 Unicorn Series III (2014 - 2017)
 Pursuit Series I (2013 - 2017)
 Pegasus GT65 (2013 - 2015)
 Unicorn Series II (2012 - 2014)
 Retreat (2012 - 2013)
 Olympus Series II (2011 - 2013)
 Orion Series I (2011 - 2013)
 Pegasus Series II (2011 - 2013)
 Unicorn Series I (2010 - 2012)
 Olympus Series I (2010 - 2011)
 Pegasus Series I (2009 - 2011)
Ranger GT65 (2000s)
Ranger GT50 (1990s)
Ranger (1990s)
Beachcomber (1990s)
Discovery (1990s)
Bailey SE (1990s)
Senator (1980s - 2000s)
Pageant (1980s - 2000s)
Scorpio (1980s)
Chieftain (1980s)
Prima (1970s)
Mikado (1960s)
Maru (1960s)
Montane (1960s)
Maritza (1950s - 1960s)
Maison (1950s - 1960s)
Minor (1950s)
Maestro (1940s - 1960s)

Motorhomes
 Alliance Silver Edition (2019 - 2021)
 Advance Series II ( 2018 - 2020)
Autograph Series II (2016 - 2019)
Alliance Series 1 (2016 - 2019)
Approach Advance (2015 - 2018)
Approach Autograph (2013 - 2016)
Approach Compact (2013 - 2014)
Approach SE (2011 - 2013)

References

External links 
 Bailey of Bristol official website
 Bailey Owners Club
PRIMA Leisure official website

Manufacturing companies based in Bristol
Recreational vehicle manufacturers
Caravan and travel trailer manufacturers